Omkoi may refer to:
 Omkoi District
 Omkoi Subdistrict